Konstantinos Nebegleras (Greek: Κωνσταντίνος Νεμπεγλέρας; born 14 April 1975) is a Greek former professional footballer and the current manager of Achilleas Farsala.

Club career 
Nebegleras was born in Larissa, and began his professional career in 1993 with his home team AEL, where he stayed for 4 years. In 1997, he continued his career at Paniliakos in the Alpha Ethniki. During the 2001 winter transfer period, he signed for Iraklis Thessaloniki, following the recommendations of then coach, Ioannis Kyrastas. During the 2004–05 season, he fell into disfavor by the team's administration, thus not being considered anymore, resulting in Nebegleras signing with Aris in January 2005. During his time at Aris, the team participated in two cup finals in 2005 and 2008. In January 2009 he moved on to Atromitos. In 2011, he participated in another Cup final, once again ending up without the trophy. In the summer of 2011, and after 14 years, he returned to AEL. In 2015, at the age of 40, he decided to continue his career at lower league side Achilleas Farsala. In his 3 years with Farsala, the team managed to return to the Gamma Ethniki. In 2018, he joined sixth tier side Dafni Glafkis and thus continued playing football at the age of 44. Staying only until January 2019, Nebegleras joined fourth tier team Atromitos Palamas. At the end of the season, Palamas won the league and thus got promoted to the Gamma Ethniki, for the first time in 17 years. On August 4, 2019, aged 44, it was announced that Nebegleras will continue his career at Iraklis Larissa in the Gamma Ethniki. On 17 June 2020, Nebegleras announced his decision to retire from football, after the expiration of his contract, at the end of the season, wanting to focus on his managerial career.

International career 
In 2001, Nebegleras was called up to represent Greece, in a 2–2 friendly against Croatia, resulting in his only cap for the country. In 2004, Greek Olympic team head coach Stratos Apostolakis nominated Nebegleras, as one of three eligible over-aged players, into his squad for the 2004 Summer Olympics. Nebegleras played in all three games for his country, but couldn't help his team qualify for the next round.

Managerial career 
On 8 June 2018, Nebegleras was announced as technical director for Football League side Trikala. After only 6 months, Nebegleras and Trikala decided to part ways. On 20 August 2019, Iraklis Larissa announced that Nebegleras, besides playing for the club, will also function as U16 assistant manager. After ending his active playing career, he also left his position as U16 assistant manager. On 27 June 2020, Nebegleras was announced as new manager for fifth tier club Falaniakos. On 14 October 2022, he was announced as new Achilleas Farsala manager.

Managerial statistics 
As of 19 March 2023.

Honours

Player 
Aris

 Greek Cup runner-up: 2004–05, 2007–08

Atromitos

 Greek Cup runner-up: 2010–11

AEL

 Gamma Ethniki: 2013–14
 Gamma Ethniki Cup: 2013–14
 Amateurs' Super Cup: 2013–14

Achilleas Farsala

 Larissa FCA: 2016–17
 Larissa FCA Cup: 2016–17
 Larissa FCA Cup runner-up: 2015–16

Atromitos Palamas

 Karditsa FCA: 2018–19

Iraklis Larissa

 Larissa FCA Supercup: 2019

References

External links
 AEL 1964 FC Official
 Atromitos Profile

1975 births
Living people
Footballers from Larissa
Greek footballers
Greece international footballers
Olympic footballers of Greece
Footballers at the 2004 Summer Olympics
Athlitiki Enosi Larissa F.C. players
Paniliakos F.C. players
Iraklis Thessaloniki F.C. players
Aris Thessaloniki F.C. players
Atromitos F.C. players
Association football midfielders